Electric Loco Shed, Gomoh is a motive power depot performing locomotive maintenance and repair facility for electric locomotives of the Indian Railways, located at Gomoh of the East Central Railway zone in Jharkhand, India.

Locomotives

References

Gomoh
Dhanbad district
1965 establishments in Bihar
Rail transport in Jharkhand